Meshir 21 - Coptic Calendar - Meshir 23 

The twenty-second day of the Coptic month of Meshir, the sixth month of the Coptic year. In common years, this day corresponds to February 16, of the Julian Calendar, and March 1, of the Gregorian Calendar. This day falls in the Coptic Season of Shemu, the season of the Harvest.

Commemorations

Saints 

 The Departure of Saint Maruta the Bishop

References 

Days of the Coptic calendar